Advanced oxidation processes (AOPs), in a broad sense, are a set of chemical treatment procedures designed to remove organic (and sometimes inorganic) materials in water and wastewater by oxidation through reactions with hydroxyl radicals (·OH). In real-world applications of wastewater treatment, however, this term usually refers more specifically to a subset of such chemical processes that employ ozone (O3), hydrogen peroxide (H2O2) and/or UV light. One such type of process is called in situ chemical oxidation.

Description
AOPs rely on in-situ production of highly reactive hydroxyl radicals (·OH). These reactive species are the strongest oxidants that can be applied in water and can oxidize virtually any compound present in the water matrix, often at a diffusion-controlled reaction speed. Consequently, ·OH reacts unselectively once formed and contaminants will be quickly and efficiently fragmented and converted into small inorganic molecules. Hydroxyl radicals are produced with the help of one or more primary oxidants (e.g. ozone, hydrogen peroxide, oxygen) and/or energy sources (e.g. ultraviolet light) or catalysts (e.g. titanium dioxide). Precise, pre-programmed dosages, sequences and combinations of these reagents are applied in order to obtain a maximum •OH yield. In general, when applied in properly tuned conditions, AOPs can reduce the concentration of contaminants from several-hundreds ppm to less than 5 ppb and therefore significantly bring COD and TOC down, which earned it the credit of “water treatment processes of the 21st century”.

The AOP procedure is particularly useful for cleaning biologically toxic or non-degradable materials such as aromatics, pesticides, petroleum constituents, and volatile organic compounds in wastewater. Additionally, AOPs can be used to treat effluent of secondary treated wastewater which is then called tertiary treatment. The contaminant materials are largely converted into stable inorganic compounds such as water, carbon dioxide and salts, i.e. they undergo mineralization. A goal of the wastewater purification by means of AOP procedures is the reduction of the chemical contaminants and the toxicity to such an extent that the cleaned wastewater may be reintroduced into receiving streams or, at least, into a conventional sewage treatment.

Although oxidation processes involving ·OH have been in use since late 19th century (such as Fenton's reagent, which was used as an analytical reagent at that time), the utilization of such oxidative species in water treatment did not receive adequate attention until Glaze et al.  suggested the possible generation of ·OH “in sufficient quantity to affect water purification” and defined the term “Advanced Oxidation Processes” for the first time in 1987. AOPs still have not been put into commercial use on a large scale (especially in developing countries) even up to today mostly because of relatively high associated costs. Nevertheless, its high oxidative capability and efficiency make AOPs a popular technique in tertiary treatment in which the most recalcitrant organic and inorganic contaminants are to be eliminated. The increasing interest in water reuse and more stringent regulations regarding water pollution are currently accelerating the implementation of AOPs at full-scale.
There are roughly 500 commercialized AOP installations around the world at present, mostly in Europe and the United States. Other countries like China are showing increasing interests in AOPs.

Chemical principles
Generally speaking, chemistry in AOPs could be essentially divided into three parts:
 Formation of ·OH;
 Initial attacks on target molecules by ·OH and their breakdown to fragments;
 Subsequent attacks by ·OH until ultimate mineralization.
The mechanism of ·OH production (Part 1) highly depends on the sort of AOP technique that is used. For example, ozonation, UV/H2O2, photocatalytic oxidation and Fenton's oxidation rely on different mechanisms of ·OH generation:
UV/H2O2:
H2O2 + UV → 2·OH (homolytic bond cleavage of the O-O bond of H2O2 leads to formation of 2·OH radicals)

 UV/HOCl:
HOCl + UV → ·OH + Cl·

Ozone based AOP:
O3 + HO− → HO2− + O2 (reaction between O3 and a hydroxyl ion leads to the formation of H2O2 (in charged form))
O3 + HO2− → HO2· + O3−· (a second O3 molecule reacts with the HO2− to produce the ozonide radical)
O3−· + H+ → HO3· (this radical gives to ·OH upon protonation)
HO3· → ·OH + O2
the reaction steps presented here are just a part of the reaction sequence, see reference for more details

 Fenton based AOP:

Fe2+ + H2O2  → Fe3++ HO· + OH− (initiation of Fenton's reagent)

Fe3+ +  H2O2  → Fe2++ HOO· + H+  (regeneration of Fe2+ catalyst)

H2O2 → HO· + HOO· + H2O (Self scavenging and decomposition of H2O2)

the reaction steps presented here are just a part of the reaction sequence, see reference for more details
Photocatalytic oxidation with TiO2:
TiO2 + UV → e− + h+ (irradiation of the photocatalytic surface leads to an excited electron (e−) and electron gap (h+))
Ti(IV) + H2O  Ti(IV)-H2O (water adsorbs onto the catalyst surface)
Ti(IV)-H2O + h+   Ti(IV)-·OH + H+ the highly reactive electron gap will react with water
the reaction steps presented here are just a part of the reaction sequence, see reference for more details

Currently there is no consensus on the detailed mechanisms in Part 3, but researchers have cast light on the processes of initial attacks in Part 2. In essence, ·OH is a radical species and should behave like a highly reactive electrophile. Thus two type of initial attacks are supposed to be Hydrogen Abstraction and Addition. The following scheme, adopted from a technical handbook and later refined, describes a possible mechanism of the oxidation of benzene by ·OH.

 

Scheme 1. Proposed mechanism of the oxidation of benzene by hydroxyl radicals

The first and second steps are electrophilic addition that breaks the aromatic ring in benzene (A) and forms two hydroxyl groups (–OH) in intermediate C. Later an ·OH grabs a hydrogen atom in one of the hydroxyl groups, producing a radical species (D) that is prone to undergo rearrangement to form a more stable radical (E). E, on the other hand, is readily attacked by ·OH and eventually forms 2,4-hexadiene-1,6-dione (F).
As long as there are sufficient ·OH radicals, subsequent attacks on compound F will continue until the fragments are all converted into small and stable molecules like H2O and CO2 in the end, but such processes may still be subject to a myriad of possible and partially unknown mechanisms.

Advantages
AOPs hold several advantages in the field of water treatment:
They can effectively eliminate organic compounds in aqueous phase, rather than collecting or transferring pollutants into another phase.
Due to the reactivity of ·OH, it reacts with many aqueous pollutants without discriminating. AOPs are therefore applicable in many, if not all, scenarios where many organic contaminants must be removed at the same time.
Some heavy metals can also be removed in forms of precipitated M(OH)x.
In some AOPs designs, disinfection can also be achieved, which makes these AOPs an integrated solution to some water quality problems.
Since the complete reduction product of ·OH is H2O, AOPs theoretically do not introduce any new hazardous substances into the water.

Current shortcomings
AOPs are not perfect and have several drawbacks.
Most prominently, the cost of AOPs is fairly high, since a continuous input of expensive chemical reagents is required to maintain the operation of most AOP systems. As a result of their very nature, AOPs require hydroxyl radicals and other reagents proportional to the quantity of contaminants to be removed.
Some techniques require pre-treatment of wastewater to ensure reliable performance, which could be potentially costly and technically demanding. For instance, presence of bicarbonate ions (HCO3−) can appreciably reduce the concentration of ·OH due to scavenging processes that yield H2O and a much less reactive species, ·CO3−. As a result, bicarbonate must be wiped out from the system or AOPs are compromised.
It is not cost effective to use solely AOPs to handle a large amount of wastewater; instead, AOPs should be deployed in the final stage after primary and secondary treatment have successfully removed a large proportion of contaminants. Ongoing research also been done to combine AOPs with biological treatment to bring the cost down.

Future 
Since AOPs were first defined in 1987, the field has witnessed a rapid development both in theory and in application. So far, TiO2/UV systems, H2O2/UV systems, and Fenton, photo-Fenton and Electro-Fenton systems have received extensive scrutiny. However, there are still many research needs on these existing AOPs.

Recent trends are the development of new, modified AOPs that are efficient and economical. In fact, there has been some studies that offer constructive solutions. For instance, doping TiO2 with non-metallic elements could possibly enhance the photocatalytic activity; and implementation of ultrasonic treatment could promote the production of hydroxyl radicals. Modified AOPs such as Fluidized-Bed Fenton has also shown great potential in terms of degradation performance and economics.

See also
 List of waste-water treatment technologies
 Fenton reaction
Electro-oxidation
 Process engineering
 Water purification

References

Further reading

Michael OD Roth: Chemical oxidation: Technology for the Nineties, volume VI: Technologies for the Nineties: 6 (Chemical oxidation) W. Wesley corner fields and John A. Roth, Technomic Publishing CO, Lancaster among other things. 1997, . (engl.)

Water treatment
Environmental engineering
Environmental chemistry
Green chemistry